Stanley Eugene Fish (born April 19, 1938) is an American literary theorist, legal scholar, author and public intellectual. He is currently the Floersheimer Distinguished Visiting Professor of Law at Yeshiva University's Benjamin N. Cardozo School of Law in New York City, although Fish has no degrees or training in law. Fish has previously served as the Davidson-Kahn Distinguished University Professor of Humanities and a professor of law at Florida International University and is dean emeritus of the College of Liberal Arts and Sciences at the University of Illinois at Chicago.

Fish is associated with postmodernism, although he views himself instead as an advocate of anti-foundationalism. He is also viewed as having influenced the rise and development of reader-response theory.

During his career he has also taught at the Cardozo School of Law, University of California, Berkeley, Johns Hopkins University, The University of Pennsylvania, Yale Law School, Columbia University, The John Marshall Law School, and Duke University.

Early life
Fish was born in Providence, Rhode Island. He was raised Jewish. His father, an immigrant from Poland, was a plumber and contractor who made it a priority for his son to get a university education. Fish became the first member of his family to attend college in the US, earning a B.A. from the University of Pennsylvania in 1959 and an M.A. from Yale University in 1960. He completed his Ph.D. in 1962, also at Yale University.

Academic career
Fish taught English at the University of California at Berkeley and Johns Hopkins University before serving as Arts and Sciences Professor of English and professor of law at Duke University from 1986 to 1998. From 1999 to 2004, he was dean of the College of Liberal Arts and Sciences at the University of Illinois at Chicago, and he served as distinguished visiting professor at the John Marshall Law School from 2000 until 2002.  Fish also held joint appointments in the Departments of Political Science and Criminal Justice and was the chairman of the Religious Studies Committee.

During his tenure there, he recruited professors respected in the academic community, and attracted attention to the college. After resigning as dean in a high-level dispute with the state of Illinois over funding UIC, Fish spent a year teaching in the Department of English. The Institute for the Humanities at UIC named a lecture series in his honor, which is still ongoing. In June 2005, he accepted the position of Davidson-Kahn Distinguished University Professor of Humanities and Law at Florida International University, teaching in the FIU College of Law.

In November 2010 he joined the board of visitors of Ralston College, a start-up institution in Savannah, Georgia. He has also been a Fellow of the American Academy of Arts and Sciences since 1985.

Milton
Fish started his career as a medievalist. His first book, published by Yale University Press in 1965, was on the late-medieval/early-Renaissance poet John Skelton. Fish explains in his partly biographical essay, "Milton, Thou Shouldst be Living at this Hour" (published in There's No Such Thing as Free Speech . . . And It's a Good Thing, Too), that he came to Milton by accident. In 1963, the same year that Fish started as an assistant professor at the University of California, Berkeley its resident Miltonist, Constantinos A. Patrides, received a grant. The chair of the department asked Fish to teach the Milton course, notwithstanding the fact that the young professor "had never — either as an undergraduate or in graduate school — taken a Milton course" (269). The eventual result was Surprised by Sin: The Reader in Paradise Lost (1967; rpt. 1997).  Fish's 2001 book, How Milton Works, reflects five decades' worth of his scholarship on Milton.

Interpretive communities
Fish is best known for his analysis of interpretive communities — an offshoot of reader-response criticism. His work in this field examines how the interpretation of a text is dependent upon each reader's own subjective experience in one or more communities, each of which is defined as a 'community' by a distinct epistemology. For Fish, a large part of what renders a reader's subjective experience valuable — that is, why it may be considered "constrained" as opposed to an uncontrolled and idiosyncratic assertion of the self — comes from a concept native to the field of linguistics called linguistic competence.

In Fish's source the term is explained as "the idea that it is possible to characterize a linguistic system that every speaker shares." In the context of literary criticism, he uses this concept to argue that a reader's approach to a text is not completely subjective, and that an internalized understanding of language shared by the native speakers of that given language makes possible the creation of normative boundaries for one's experience with language.

Fish and university politics
Fish has written extensively on the politics of the university, having taken positions supporting campus speech codes and criticizing political statements by universities or faculty bodies on matters outside their professional areas of expertise.

He argued in January 2008 on his New York Times-syndicated blog that the humanities are of no instrumental value, but have only intrinsic worth. He explains, "To the question 'of what use are the humanities?', the only honest answer is none whatsoever. And it is an answer that brings honor to its subject. Justification, after all, confers value on an activity from a perspective outside its performance. An activity that cannot be justified is an activity that refuses to regard itself as instrumental to some larger good. The humanities are their own good. There is nothing more to say, and anything that is said diminishes the object of its supposed praise."

Fish has lectured across the US at many universities and colleges including Florida Atlantic University, Brown University, the University of Pennsylvania, Harvard University, University of Toronto, Columbia University, the University of Vermont, the University of Georgia, the University of Louisville, San Diego State University, the University of Kentucky, Bates College, the University of Central Florida, the University of West Florida, and the Benjamin N. Cardozo School of Law.

Fish as university politician
As chair of the Duke English department from 1986 to 1992, Fish attracted attention and controversy. Fish, according to Lingua Franca, used "shameless—and in academe unheard-of—entrepreneurial gusto" to take "a respectable but staid Southern English department and transform it into the professional powerhouse of the day", in part through the payment of lavish salaries. His time at Duke saw comparatively quite light undergraduate and graduate coursework requirements for students, matched by their heavy graduate teaching requirements. This permitted professors to reduce their own teaching. In April 1992, near the end of Fish's time as department chair, an external review committee considered evidence that the English curriculum had become "a hodgepodge of uncoordinated offerings", lacking in "broad foundational courses" or faculty planning. The department's dissipating prominence in the 1990s was featured on the front page of The New York Times.

Criticisms of his work
As a frequent contributor to The New York Times and The Wall Street Journal editorial page, Fish has been the target of wide-ranging criticism.

Writing in Slate magazine, Judith Shulevitz reported that not only does Fish openly proclaim himself "unprincipled" but also rejects wholesale the concepts of "fairness, impartiality, reasonableness." To Fish, "ideas have no consequences." For taking this stance, Shulevitz characterizes Fish as "not the unprincipled relativist he's accused of being. He's something worse. He's a fatalist."

Likewise, among academics, Fish has endured vigorous criticism. The conservative R. V. Young writes, 

Terry Eagleton, a prominent British Marxist, excoriates Fish's "discreditable epistemology" as "sinister". According to Eagleton, "Like almost all diatribes against universalism, Fish's critique of universalism has its own rigid universals: the priority at all times and places of sectoral interests, the permanence of conflict, the a priori status of belief systems, the rhetorical character of truth, the fact that all apparent openness is secretly closure, and the like." Of Fish's attempt to co-opt the critiques leveled against him, Eagleton responds, "The felicitous upshot is that nobody can ever criticise Fish, since if their criticisms are intelligible to him, they belong to his cultural game and are thus not really criticisms at all; and if they are not intelligible, they belong to some other set of conventions entirely and are therefore irrelevant."

In the essay "Sophistry about Conventions", philosopher Martha Nussbaum argues that Fish's theoretical views are based on "extreme relativism and even radical subjectivism." Discounting his work as nothing more than sophistry, Nussbaum claims that Fish "relies on the regulative principle of non-contradiction in order to adjudicate between competing principles", thereby relying on normative standards of argumentation even as he argues against them.  Offering an alternative, Nussbaum cites John Rawls's work in A Theory of Justice to highlight "an example of a rational argument; it can be said to yield, in a perfectly recognizable sense, ethical truth." Nussbaum appropriates Rawls's critique of the insufficiencies of Utilitarianism, showing that a rational person will consistently prefer a system of justice that acknowledges boundaries between separate persons rather than relying on the aggregation of the sum total of desires. "This", she claims, "is altogether different from rhetorical manipulation."

Camille Paglia, author of Sexual Personae and public intellectual, denounced Fish as a "totalitarian Tinkerbell," charging him with hypocrisy for lecturing about multiculturalism from the perspective of a tenured professor at the homogeneous and sheltered ivory tower of Duke.

David Hirsch, a critic of post-structuralist influences on hermeneutics, censured Fish for "lapses in logical rigor" and "carelessness toward rhetorical precision." In an examination of Fish's arguments, Hirsch attempts to demonstrate that "not only was a restoration of New Critical methods unnecessary, but that Fish himself had not managed to rid himself of the shackles of New Critical theory."  Hirsch compares Fish's work to Penelope's loom in the Odyssey, stating, "what one critic weaves by day, another unweaves by night."  "Nor," he writes, "does this weaving and unweaving constitute a dialectic, since no forward movement takes place."  Ultimately, Hirsch sees Fish as left to "wander in his own Elysian fields, hopelessly alienated from art, from truth, and from humanity."

Personal life
He is married to literary critic Jane Tompkins.

Awards
Fish received the PEN/Diamonstein-Spielvogel Award for the Art of the Essay in 1994 for There's No Such Thing As Free Speech, and it's a Good Thing, Too.

Bibliography

Primary works by Fish
John Skelton's Poetry.  New Haven, CT: Yale UP, 1965.
Surprised by Sin: The Reader in Paradise Lost.  Cambridge, MA: Harvard UP, 1967.   (10).   (13).
 Self-Consuming Artifacts: The Experience of Seventeenth-Century Literature.  Berkeley, CA: U of California P, 1972.
"Interpreting the Variorum."  Critical Inquiry (1976).
"Why We Can't All Just Get Along."  First Things (1996).
The Living Temple: George Herbert and Catechizing.  Berkeley, CA: U of California P, 1978.
Is There a Text in This Class? The Authority of Interpretive Communities.  Cambridge, MA: Harvard UP, 1980.   (10).  (13).
Doing What Comes Naturally: Change, Rhetoric, and the Practice of Theory in Literary and Legal Studies.  Durham, NC: Duke UP, 1989.
Professional Correctness: Literary Studies and Political Change.  Cambridge, MA: Harvard U P, 1999.
The Trouble with Principle.  Cambridge, MA: Harvard UP, 1999.
How Milton Works.  Cambridge, MA: Harvard UP, 2001.
Save The World on Your Own Time Oxford: Oxford University Press, 2008.
The Fugitive in Flight: Faith, Liberalism, and Law in a Classic TV Show. Philadelphia, PA: University of Pennsylvania Press, 2010.
How to Write a Sentence: And How to Read One. New York, NY: HarperCollins Publishers, 2011.
Versions of Antihumanism: Milton and Others. Cambridge: Cambridge University Press, 2012. 
* Versions of Academic Freedom: From Professionalism to Revolution. Chicago, IL: University of Chicago Press, 2014. .
Winning Arguments: What Works and Doesn't Work in Politics, the Bedroom, the Courtroom, and the Classroom. New York, NY: HarperCollins, 2016. .
The First: How to Think About Hate Speech, Campus Speech, Religious Speech, Fake News, Post-Truth, and Donald Trump. Atria/One Signal Publishers. 2019 .

Collections of works by Fish
There's No Such Thing As Free Speech, and it's a Good Thing, Too.  New York: Oxford UP, 1994.
The title essay and an additional essay, "Jerry Falwell's Mother," focus on free speech issues.  In the latter piece, Fish argues that, if one has some answer in mind to the question "what is free speech good for?" along the lines of "in the free and open clash of viewpoints the truth can more readily be known," then it makes no sense to defend deliberate malicious libel (such as that which was at issue in the U.S. Supreme Court case of Hustler Magazine v. Falwell) in the name of "free speech."
The Stanley Fish Reader.  Ed. H. Aram Veeser.  London: Blackwell Publishers, 1999.
Think Again: Contrarian Reflections on Life, Culture, Politics, Religion, Law, and Education, Princeton, (2015),

See also
Formalism
New Criticism

Notes and references

Further reading
Robertson, Michael. Stanley Fish on Philosophy, Politics and Law. Cambridge University Press, 2014
Olson, Gary A.  Stanley Fish, America's Enfant Terrible: The Authorized Biography. Carbondale: SIU P, 2016.
Olson, Gary A.  Justifying Belief: Stanley Fish and the Work of Rhetoric.  Albany: SUNY P, 2002.
Postmodern Sophistry: Stanley Fish and the Critical Enterprise.  Ed. Gary Olson and Lynn Worsham.  Albany, NY: SUNY P, 2004.
Owen, J. Judd. Religion and the Demise of Liberal Rationalism.  Chapters 6–8 and "Appendix: A Reply to Stanley Fish." University of Chicago Press, 2001.
Perez-Firmat, Gustavo: “Interpretive Assumptions and Interpreted Texts:  On a Poem by Stanley Fish,” Essays in Literature, 11 (1984), 145–52.
Lang, Chris "The Reader-Response Theory of Stanley Fish"
Landa, José Ángel García "Stanley E. Fish's Speech Acts"
Pierre Schlag, "Fish v. Zapp--The Case of the Relatively Autonomous Self," 76 Georgetown Law Journal 37 (1988)

External links

Interview with Stanley Fish published in The minnesota review March 3, 2000.  Accessed December 23, 2006.
"Leading Professor Stanley Fish to Join FIU Law Faculty."  Press release.  Florida International University.  June 29, 2005.
Stanley Fish  article published in the Johns Hopkins University Guide to Literary Theory & Criticism.
Stanley Fish.  Florida International University Law School faculty biography.
Stanley Fish's blog  at The New York Times Editorial section.
Stanley Fish on Deconstruction .  Radio interview with program host, Hugh LaFollette.  WETS-FM.  University of San Francisco.  n.d.  (Audio link.)

WorldCat Identities page for Stanley Eugene Fish

Archival collections
Guide to the Stanley Fish Papers. Special Collections and Archives, The UC Irvine Libraries, Irvine, California

1938 births
American academics of English literature
American people of Polish-Jewish descent
American literary critics
American rhetoricians
Duke University faculty
Fellows of the American Academy of Arts and Sciences
Florida International University faculty
Johns Hopkins University faculty
Literary critics of English
Living people
PEN/Diamonstein-Spielvogel Award winners
Writers from Providence, Rhode Island
University of California, Berkeley faculty
University of Illinois Chicago faculty
University of Pennsylvania alumni
Yale University alumni
Florida International University College of Law faculty